Golidagh District is a district (bakhsh) in Maraveh Tappeh County, Golestan Province, Iran. At the 2006 census, its population was 16,506, in 3,188 families.  The District has no cities. The District has one rural district (dehestan): Golidagh Rural District.

References 

Districts of Golestan Province
Maraveh Tappeh County